The MEDIA sub-programme of Creative Europe or simply Creative Europe MEDIA (formerly The MEDIA Programme of the European Union) is designed to support the European film and audiovisual industries.

Supported films
MEDIA supported films include:

1991
Delicatessen
Europa
Les Amants du Pont-Neuf

1993
The House of the Spirits
Orlando

1994
Nattevagten
Il Postino

1995
Land and Freedom
The City of Lost Children
Flamenco

1996
Trainspotting
Drifting Clouds
The Seventh Brother
Secrets & Lies
Hamsun
Farinelli
Breaking the Waves

1997
La promesse
La vita è bella
Smilla's Sense of Snow
Western

1998
On connaît la chanson
The Full Monty
Festen
Fucking Åmål
Idioterne
Kirikou et la Sorcière
My Name Is Joe

1999
Todo sobre mi madre
East Is East

2000
101 Reykjavík
Dancer in the Dark
Italiensk for begyndere
Englar alheimsins

2001
Amélie
La Pianiste
Billy Elliot   
Elling
Ničija zemlja
La stanza del figlio

2002
The Pianist
Être et Avoir
Mies vailla menneisyyttä
Habla con ella
Lilya 4-ever
The Hours
8 Femmes
Respiro
Hundstage

2003
Les Triplettes de Belleville
Girl with a Pearl Earring
Good Bye, Lenin!
Dogville
La meglio gioventù
In This World
Nói albinói

2004
Sophie Scholl – Die letzten Tage
La mala educación
Der Untergang
Gegen die Wand

2005
L'Enfant
Mar adentro
Caché
Habana Blues
Paradise Now
Va, Vis et Deviens
Match Point
La Marche de l'empereur

2006
The Lives of Others
Volver
This Is England
The Wind That Shakes the Barley
Efter brylluppet
Pan's Labyrinth
Zwartboek
Taxidermia
Lotte from Gadgetville

2007
Auf der anderen Seite
Die Fälscher
4 luni, 3 săptămâni şi 2 zile
Persepolis
Irina Palm
Joulutarina
Control
Funny Games
Le scaphandre et le papillon
Mr. Magorium's Wonder Emporium
Fly Me to the Moon

2008
Gomorra
Slumdog Millionaire
Entre les murs
Niko - Lentäjän poika
Le silence de Lorna
Vals Im Bashir
The Queen
Séraphine
Rabbit à la Berlin
33 sceny z zycia
Hunger

2009
Das weiße Band, Eine deutsche Kindergeschichte
Un prophète
Antichrist
An Education
The Good Heart
Videocracy
Drottningen och jag
Los abrazos rotos
3 sezóny v pekle
L'Illusionniste

2010
Buried
Des hommes et des dieux
Illégal
Hævnen
The King's Speech
Submarino
Sound of Noise

2011
30 Minutes or Less
Pina
Arthur Christmas (uncredited)
Hodejegerne
Le Havre
Le gamin au vélo
Les Neiges du Kilimandjaro
Melancholia
Oslo, 31. august
The Iron Lady
Polisse
We Need to Talk About Kevin

2012
En kongelig affære
Play
Shame
Amour
Babycall
Barbara
Jagten
De rouille et d'os
Paradies: Liebe
To Rome with Love

2018
King of Thieves

2019
Vivarium
A Shaun the Sheep Movie: Farmageddon

2022
Triangle of Sadness
Godland
The Amazing Maurice

2023
Teenage Mutant Ninja Turtles: Mutant Mayhem

Cineuropa
Cineuropa (cineuropa) is a website for the European film industry, funded by Creative Europe MEDIA, and Italy, Wallonie-Bruxelles, France, Switzerland, European Parliament, Eurimages, Kosovo, Slovakia, Spain, Luxembourg, Germany, Slovenia, Lithuania, Latvia, Estonia, Georgia. It features a film industry database, reviews, interviews, news, and an online screenwriting course.

Administration
MEDIA is an abbreviation from French: Mesures pour Encourager le Développement de L'Industrie Audiovisuelle - "measures to support the development of the audiovisual industries. The MEDIA programme used to be jointly run by the European Commission Directorate-General for Education and Culture (DG EAC) and the Education, Audiovisual & Culture Executive Agency (EACEA Unit P8), which was in charge of the operational management of the MEDIA programme. Since 2014, it is run by the European Commission Directorate-General for Communications Networks, Content and Technology (CONNECT).

See also
Culture and the European Union
Education in the European Union
Culture 2000
Directorate-General for Information Society and Media
List of movie-related topics
Europa Cinemas
 European Cross Media Academy
European Film Promotion

Notes

External links
  MEDIA's English Homepage

Cultural policies of the European Union
European cinema
Bodies of the European Union
Organizations established in 1990
Film organisations in Belgium
Subsidies
European cultural exchange
Virtual reality companies